Big Bear Lake is a reservoir in the western United States, located in the San Bernardino Mountains in San Bernardino County, California. It is a snow and rain-fed lake, having no other means of tributaries or mechanical replenishment.

These approximations are based on the lake having an optimum retainable water level.

History 

The region has been the ancestral home of the indigenous Serrano people for approximately 2,500 years. They referred to the territory as "Yuhaviat" which translates into "Pine Place". They inhabited small villages of 10 to 30 round buildings located along fresh water sources and subsisted on berries, nuts, tubers, acorns, and plentiful game harvested along the lush valley. The Serrano looked at the native grizzly bears as ancestors and did not eat the meat or wear the fur of these massive animals. Several communities in the area feature place names reflecting the Big Bear region's rich Native history. These include Yucaipa, Cucamonga, and Muscupiabe.

European explorers first saw the area when a Native American hunting party was formed by Benjamin Wilson. Wilson moved to California during the days of Mexican territorial Alta California. He married into the Spanish landholder family, the Yorbas, and bought a portion of Rancho Jurupa (Riverside) from Juan Bandini. He became a local rancher statesman.

Wilson had signed on as Justice of the Peace of the Inland Territory and was commissioned by the territorial authorities to locate and pursue Native Americans suspected of raiding ranches in nearby Riverside. This group, led by the fierce Chief Walkara, drove the herd into the Lucerne Valley on the north side of the San Bernardinos. Wilson gathered a posse of 44 men, 22 of whom he sent through the Cajon Pass while he engineered a pincer movement with the other 22 men into the headwaters of the Santa Ana River, effectively cutting the Utes off at the other end of Lucerne.

On the trip Wilson came upon a broad watershed teeming with wildlife, particularly bear. His posse immediately became a hunting party where the men were split into 11 pairs, each pair bringing back a bear hide. Wilson dubbed the grassy expanse "Bear Valley" and one of the nearby shallow seasonal marshes "Big Bear Lake". This same ephemeral feature is today called Baldwin Lake after Elias J. "Lucky" Baldwin of Rancho Santa Anita, who bought the nearby Gold Mountain Mine that was renamed for him in 1876. On Wilson's return trip, the party took 11 more bear pelts.

In 1859, the valley became a venue for gold prospectors. William F. Holcomb, a prospector from Indiana, moved to Los Angeles from the Northern California mines where he heard about the prospecting at Big Bear. He moved to Starvation Flats, where he had little luck the first winter. Because of his marksmanship, he was hired by several of the other miners to hunt bear for meat. With his Indian companion, Holcomb tracked, shot and wounded a grizzly bear one ridge north of Bear Valley. There he noticed a vein of quartz flecked with gold. When this discovery was revealed, the Southern California gold rush was on, and Holcomb Valley quickly became the largest populated area in San Bernardino County.

Redlands citrus growers found that the 1884 dam produced insufficient water. The Bear Valley Mutual Water Company (successor to Bear Valley Irrigation Company) hired John S. Eastwood to design a new dam. The original granite dam still remains, usually under about 20 feet of water. A highway bridge (SR 18) was built over the arches of the new dam in 1923. A new bypass bridge was built next to the old bridge in 2009, and the old bridge on top of the new dam was removed (12). Big Bear Municipal Water District acquired the dam and other assets from the Mutual Water Company in 1977.

The unregulated hunting of grizzly bear in the San Bernardinos took a heavy toll upon the once significant population, and by 1906 all the local Ursus californicus were killed off.

Tourism began with the onset of the automobile and the eventual establishment of highways accessing the remote area.  Hollywood soon discovered Big Bear, and several movies, particularly westerns, have been filmed in the region.

Geography

Big Bear Lake is geophysically defined by its North and South Shore. Big Bear Boulevard follows the South Shore and leads into the Big Bear Valley as a continuation of Highway 18 (the so-called Rim of the World Highway, which approaches from the west). Big Bear Boulevard winds east through Papoose Bay, Boulder Bay and Metcalf Bay, then leads directly east to the city of Big Bear Lake. At a point called The Village, the road turns toward the lake and then curves eastward to Moonridge, the ski resorts at Snow Summit and Bear Mountain, and Stanfield Cutoff, a causeway located near the east end of the lake. Big Bear Boulevard then continues east into Big Bear City, which is an unincorporated community despite its name.

North Shore (Highway 38) begins at the Dam Junction of Highway 18. It travels east past the historic location of Gray's Landing, a famous 1920s fishing camp. It turns north around Grout Bay and travels through the small unincorporated town of Fawnskin. The road meanders across North Shore through Forestry lands, past the Big Bear Solar Observatory, past the Big Bear Discovery Center, past the Serrano Campground (U.S.F.S), accessing the public boat launch, and Stanfield Cutoff. North Shore Drive continues east into Big Bear City and Baldwin Lake.

The primary approach to Big Bear is via Highway 330 out of San Bernardino through Running Springs where it intersects Highway 18. Big Bear Lake can also be accessed by Hwy 38 (referred to as 'The Backside') at the San Bernardino (10) Freeway near Redlands, and takes a  mile route that passes through Big Bear City on the east. From north of Lucerne Valley, it can be accessed by Highway 18 over the pass into Baldwin Lake and through the north side, into Big Bear City.

Climate

Freezing temperatures have occurred in every month and occur on an average of 186 days each year, on average from September 24 to June 4.

Due to the  elevation of the weather station, precipitation is greater than in the lowlands of San Bernardino County, averaging  a year. Measurable precipitation normally occurs 44.9 days a year. Mountain thunderstorms occasionally produce heavy rainfall, even in midsummer (when most southern California lowland locations are quite dry). Big Bear Lake's climate is Csb (Warm-summer Mediterranean) under the Köppen climate classification.

In contrast to most of southern California, the Big Bear Lake region normally receives significant winter snow because of its high elevation. In February 1990,  of snow were recorded. Snow has fallen in every month except July and August.

Transportation 

Public transit to and from San Bernardino, and among the communities surrounding the lake are provided by Mountain Transit.

Activities
Big Bear Lake provides an attractive setting for many outdoor activities, including fishing (trout, bluegill, crappie, catfish and largemouth bass), pleasure boating, and water skiing. Because of the very cold water and the presence of underwater obstacles near the shorelines, swimming is discouraged. The lake is patrolled by the BBMWD Lake Patrol.

Many lakeside residents have private docks, and visiting boaters obtain mooring in several of the marinas found on both shores. Big Bear Municipal Water District (a special district of the State of California) provides public launches on the east end and west end of North Shore. Local marinas rent various sport and pleasure boats, and parasailing is available.

The California Office of Environmental Health Hazard Assessment (OEHHA) has developed an advisory for Big Bear Lake because of mercury and PCBs found in fish caught here. The advisory provides safe eating advice for black bass species, common carp, crappie, and rainbow trout.

Points of interest
North Shore (west to east)
Fawnskin (San Bernardino County uninc.)
Big Bear Solar Observatory (New Jersey Institute of Technology)
Big Bear Discovery Center
South Shore (west to east)
Snow Summit (skiing; snowboarding; mountain biking in summer; ski lift open in summer for sightseeing)
Bear Mountain (skiing and snowboarding in winter; golf course in summer)

California Historical Landmark
California Historical Landmark at the Big Bear Dam reads:
NO. 725 OLD BEAR VALLEY DAM - In 1884 Frank Brown built an unusual dam here to supply irrigation water for the Redlands area. The single-arch granite dam formed Big Bear Lake, then the world's largest man-made lake. Engineers claimed the dam would not hold, and declared it "The Eighth Wonder of the World" when it did. The old dam is usually underwater because of the 20-foot higher dam built 200 feet west in 1912. 

The Bear Valley Dams were also designated as a Local Historic Civil Engineering Landmark by the American Society of Civil Engineers in 1972.

See also
Big Bear City, California, an unincorporated town east of Big Bear Lake
List of people from Big Bear Lake, California
List of dams and reservoirs in California
List of lakes in California
California Historical Landmarks in San Bernardino County, California

References

External links

List of dams and reservoirs in California

Reservoirs in San Bernardino County, California
Big Bear Valley
San Bernardino Mountains
San Bernardino National Forest
Reservoirs in California
Reservoirs in Southern California
Tourist attractions in San Bernardino County, California
California Historical Landmarks